The 2019 Atlantic 10 women's basketball tournament was a postseason tournament that conclude the 2018–19 season of the Atlantic 10 Conference. It was played at campus sites on March 5 for the first round, with the remaining games held on March 8–10 at the Palumbo Center in Pittsburgh, Pennsylvania. Fordham defeated VCU, 62–47, to win the tournament championship and earn the automatic bid to the NCAA tournament.

Seeds
Teams were seeded by record within the conference, with a tiebreaker system to seed teams with identical conference records.

Schedule

*Game times in Eastern Time. #Rankings denote tournament seeding.

Bracket
 All times are Eastern.

References

See also
2019 Atlantic 10 men's basketball tournament

2018–19 Atlantic 10 Conference women's basketball season
Atlantic 10 women's basketball tournament
Atlantic 10 women's basketball tournament
Basketball in Pittsburgh